It's a Cheating Situation is the 11th album by country singer Moe Bandy (Marion Franklin Bandy, Jr.) released in 1979 on the Columbia label recorded at the Jack Clement Recording Studio "B" (Engineer Billy Sherrill) and CBS Recording Studios, Nashville, Tennessee (Engineer Ron Reynolds).

Track listing

"It's a Cheating Situation" (with Janie Fricke) (Curly Putman, Sonny Throckmorton) - 2:39
"Barstool Mountain" (Donn Tankersley, Wayne Carson Thompson) - 2:42
"Cheaters Never Win" (Sanger D. Shafer, Arthur Leo "Doodle" Owens) - 2:28
"Conscience Where Were You (When I Needed You Last Night)" (Sanger D. Shafer, Warren Robb) - 2:44
"Try My Love On for Size" (Herb McCollough) - 2:15
"To Cheat Or Not To Cheat" (Bobby P. Barker) - 3:24
"She Stays In The Name of Love" (Max D. Barnes) - 2:32
"It Just Helps To Keep The Hurt From Hurtin'" (Cindy Walker) - 2:50
"When My Working Girl Comes Home (And Works on Me)" (Carl Belew, Van Givens) - 2:37
"They Haven't Made The Drink (That Can Get Me Over You)" (Sanger D. Shafer, Arthur Leo "Doodle" Owens) - 2:37

Musicians
Bob Moore
Johnny Gimble
Hargus "Pig" Robbins (Courtesy of Elektra Records)
Bobby Thompson
Weldon Myrick
Leo Jackson
Jerry Carrigan
Reggie Young
Charlie McCoy (Courtesy of Monument Records)
Tommy Allsup
Jimmy Capps
Kenny Malone
Tommy Jackson
Ray Edenton

Backing
The Jordanaires with Janie Fricke.

Production
Sound engineers - Ron Reynolds, Billy Sherrill
Photography - Clark Thomas

1979 albums
Moe Bandy albums
Columbia Records albums
Albums produced by Ray Baker (music producer)